a/k/a Tommy Chong is a 2006 documentary film written, produced, and directed by Josh Gilbert, that chronicles the Drug Enforcement Administration raid on comedian Tommy Chong's house and his subsequent jail sentence for trafficking in illegal drug paraphernalia. He was sentenced to nine months in federal prison.  DEA agents raided Chong's Pacific Palisades, California home on the morning of February 24, 2003. The raid was part of Operation Pipe Dreams and "Operation Headhunter," which resulted in raids on 100 homes and businesses nationwide that day and indictments of 55 individuals.

The film was shown at film festivals in 2005 and 2006 and had its first, art-house theatrical release on June 14, 2006, at the Film Forum in New York City.  The film features appearances by Bill Maher and Jay Leno, who express support for Chong and outrage over federal handling of the incident. Eric Schlosser, author of Reefer Madness: Sex, Drugs, and Cheap Labor in the American Black Market, provides "a much needed dollop of historical and political context".  The film was presented on the Showtime cable network on November 9, 2008. The film received positive reviews.

Synopsis
The film depicts Tommy Chong of Cheech and Chong and his legal problems with The Department of Justice. Filmmaker Josh Gilbert follows the tale of Chong as he becomes a target in a government sting, code named "Operation Pipe Dreams". Tommy Chong was the only defendant without a prior conviction to receive a jail sentence.  The federal government stated that the reason that it sought this harsh punishment was because the comedy movie Up In Smoke trivialized the government's anti-drug efforts.

The documentary discloses that Tommy Chong's son, who actually ran the company which sold the paraphernalia was never charged or indicted by the Federal government.  In May 2008 federal agents raided the owner of the distribution rights to this DVD.

The documentary is critical of the prosecution of Chong by the U.S. federal government led by the U.S. attorney for western Pennsylvania, Mary Beth Buchanan.

Reception

Reviews
The film received positive reviews. Entertainment Weekly gave it a "B", calling it a "slender, revealing documentary, ... is a portrait of resilience: Chong does his time (nine months) and has the last laugh, emerging as a born-again activist-survivor of the culture wars."  In the New York Daily News,  Elizabeth Weltzmen gave the film  2 1/2 stars (of 4), writing, "... even those unimpressed with [Cheech and Chong's] genially lowbrow work will be intrigued by the political tenor of this portrait."  She continues, "Gilbert blatantly takes Chong's side, so your level of empathy will rise or fall depending on how strongly you connect with his subject."  
Wesley Morris of the Boston Globe wrote, "This isn't a great piece of nonfiction filmmaking, but it has its moments", stating that Chong's presence in the film lent "a serene counterpoint to the farce Gilbert makes of the Justice Department...", but, "the movie does succeed in showing us the graying cult star as a gratuitous drug-war casualty". At review aggregator Rotten Tomatoes, the film has a score of 71% among 21 selected critic reviews.

Recognition
Official Selection – Toronto International Film Festival
Official Selection – IDFA: International Documentary Festival Amsterdam
Official Selection – Palm Springs International Film Festival
Official Selection – Miami International Film Festival
Official Selection – SXSW Film Festival
Official Selection – Full Frame Documentary Festival
Winner, Best Documentary – HBO US Comedy Arts Festival
Audience Award, Best Documentary – San Francisco Independent Film Festival
Audience Award Runner Up, Best International Film – Vancouver International Film Festival

Seizure of DVDs
On May 7, 2008, federal agents raided Spectrum Labs as part of an investigation related to "drug masking products" used to fool drug tests. Chong alleges that 8,000 to 10,000 copies of his yet-to-be released documentary, which he claims were seized by the authorities, were the actual focal point of the raid. "It's a way to punish the distributor financially," Mr. Chong said. "There's no way to get the DVDs back until the investigation is over." However, attorneys for Spectrum Labs have said no copies of the documentary were seized. U.S. Attorney Mary Beth Buchanan, who led the investigation, refused to comment on Mr. Chong's allegation.

References

External links
 
 

2006 films
2006 documentary films
American documentary films
2000s English-language films
2000s American films